This is a list of events in Scottish television from 1986.

Events

January
No events.

February
No events.

March
No events.

April
4 April – Debut of the children's television series The Campbells on Scottish Television. The series – a joint Scottish-Canadian production – later aired nationally on ITV.

May
12 May – Debut of the BBC Scotland comedy Naked Video.

June
No events.

July
23 July – Television coverage of the marriage of Prince Andrew, Duke of York and Sarah, Duchess of York at Westminster Abbey.

August
No events.

September
1 September – 25th anniversary of Border Television.
3 September – BBC Scotland announce details of their £20m autumn/winter line-up of programmes.
30 September – 25th anniversary of Grampian Television.

October
 20 October – Following considerable criticism, including from the Independent Broadcasting Authority, the 1984 changes made by Scottish Television to Scotland Today are reversed and the programme once again becomes a news broadcast with the feature elements transferred to a new lunchtime programme called Live at One Thirty.
27 October – BBC One starts a full daytime television service. Before today, excluding special events coverage, BBC One had closed down at times during weekday mornings and afternoons broadcasting trade test transmissions and, from May 1983, Pages From Ceefax. As part of the new service, changes are made to the timings of the daytime Scottish news bulletins. The lunchtime summary is broadcast prior to the lunchtime news, at 12:55 pm, and the mid-afternoon summary moves from BBC1 to BBC2. Also, the Gaelic children's slot moves to 9.45am.

November
No events.

December
No events.

Debuts

BBC
12 May – Naked Video (1986–1991)

ITV
10 March – James the Cat (1986–1992)
4 April – / The Campbells on Scottish Television (1986–1990)

Television series
Scotsport (1957–2008)
Reporting Scotland (1968–1983; 1984–present)
Top Club (1971–1998)
Scotland Today (1972–2009)
Sportscene (1975–present)
The Beechgrove Garden (1978–present)
Grampian Today (1980–2009)
Take the High Road (1980–2003)
Taggart (1983–2010)
James the Cat (1984–1992)
Crossfire on Grampian (1984–2004)
City Lights (1984–1991)

Ending this year
27 July – Now You See It (1981–1986)

Births
8 February – Ashley Mulheron, actress and television presenter
18 November – Georgia King, actress
Unknown – Richard Madden, actor

Deaths
25 December – Bill Simpson, 55, actor

See also
1986 in Scotland

References

 
Television in Scotland by year
1980s in Scottish television